Carter Michael (born 13 December 2001) is a professional Australian rules footballer playing for the Brisbane Lions in the Australian Football League (AFL).

Early life
Michael was raised on the Sunshine Coast, Queensland. He attended Auskick at the Sunshine Coast. Carter played both junior and senior football with Maroochydore in the (QAFL). He was identified by the Brisbane Lions as a potential player as and added to the Under 18 Brisbane Lions Academy as a 16 year old. Michael went on to represent Queensland at Under 17 level at the National Championships. He was taken by the Lions in the 2020 rookie draft and spent two years developing in the VFL with the Lions reserves.

AFL career
Carter made his debut in round 17, 2022 and kicked a goal in his first game.

Statistics
Updated to the end of the 2022 season.

|-
| 2021 ||  || 39
| 0 || – || – || – || – || – || – || – || – || – || – || – || – || – || –
|-
| 2022 ||  || 39
| 1 || 1 || 0 || 7 || 1 || 8 || 3 || 2 || 1.0 || 0.0 || 7.0 || 1.0 || 8.0 || 3.0 || 2.0
|- class=sortbottom
! colspan=3 | Career
! 1 !! 1 !! 0 !! 7 !! 1 !! 8 !! 3 !! 2 !! 1.0 !! 0.0 !! 7.0 !! 1.0 !! 8.0 !! 3.0 !! 2.0
|}

References

Living people
Brisbane Lions players
2002 births